Abrar Shaikh (born 14 August 1993) is an Indian cricketer. He made his List A debut for Saurashtra in the 2016–17 Vijay Hazare Trophy on 25 February 2017.

References

External links
 

1993 births
Living people
Indian cricketers
Saurashtra cricketers
Place of birth missing (living people)